Mick Buckley (4 November 1953 – 7 October 2013) was an English footballer who played for Everton, Sunderland, Hartlepool United, Carlisle United and Middlesbrough as a midfielder.

Club career
Buckley was born in Salford. He started his professional footballing career with Everton in 1971 and made 135 appearances for them, with ten goals. A youth team product, who had rejected advances from Manchester United and Manchester City as a schoolboy, he made his debut in March 1972, with manager Harry Catterick viewing him as a long-term replacement for Colin Harvey. However it would not be until the arrival of Billy Bingham that Buckley fully came to the fore, and was a regular first-teamer during three of Bingham's seasons in charge. He suffered a series of injuries in 1977 and during his absence both Trevor Ross and Andy King forced their way into the first team picture, with Buckley sidelined when he returned to fitness. Unable to regain his first team spot, Buckley was sold to Sunderland in August 1978 for £80,000.

Buckley made his debut for Sunderland on 2 September 1978 against Preston North End in a 3–1 at Roker Park. He went on to make a total of 121 league appearances, scoring 7 goals for the club. He then moved to fellow North East team Hartlepool United in 1983 where he scored no goals in just six appearances, he spent one season at the club. Towards the end of his career, he spent seasons at Carlisle United and Middlesbrough.

Buckley died in October 2013 at the age of 59.

References

1953 births
2013 deaths
Footballers from Manchester
English footballers
England under-23 international footballers
Everton F.C. players
Sunderland A.F.C. players
Hartlepool United F.C. players
Carlisle United F.C. players
Middlesbrough F.C. players
Association football midfielders